Taiping is a town in Zoucheng, Jining, in southwestern Shandong province, China. , it administers Baodian Residential Community and the following 92 villages:
Zhuangli Village
Zhongtaocheng Village
Xizhaozhuang Village
Zhaoqiao Village
Zhangjiaxing Village
Zhaijiaxing Village
Yingou Village
Xingfulou Village
Xiejiazhuang Village
Xiliyan Village
Xijigou First Village
Xijigou Second Village
Xijigou Third Village
Xiguaitou Village
Xibaozhang Village
Wangshi Village
Wangfuzhai Village
Taixinzhuang Village
Taiping First Village
Taiping Second Village
Taiping Third Village
Taiping Fourth Village
Sunmiao Village
Shaozhuang Village
Qiujialou Village
Qinshi Village
Qinhe Village
Nankangfu Village
Nantaocheng Village
Majie Village
Liumiao Village
Linjiahai Village
Lijie Village
Lijiaji Village
Jiadao Village
Huangyuan Village
Houwangzhuang Village
Haozhuang Village
Hanshi Village
Hanlou Village
Hankeng Village
Guozhuang Village
Guanyintang Village
Gaoying Village
Gaoshi Village
Gaojiachang Village
Fengjiazhuang Village
Fenglou Village
Fengjiaji Village
Fanjiaqiao Village
Dongshi Village
Dongliyan Village
Dongjigou First Village
Dongjigou Second Village
Dongguaitou Village
Dongbianzhuang Village
Cuizhuang Village
Cuijing Village
Dabianzhuang Village
Beikangfu Village
Baiyitang Village
Anshang Village
Zhongxing Village
Zhongbaojiadian Village
Zhengxing Village
Yinzhang Village
Yao'anzhuang Village
Xingxing Village
Xing Village
Xinliuzhuang Village
Xiejiakou Village
Xihenghe Village
Wangxing Village
Sunpo Village
Qianhuangfuzhuang Village
Qianhan Village
Qianbaojiadian Village
Qiling Village
Pingyangsi Village
Liuxing Village
Liujiahekou Village
Huangjiazhuang Village
Huangchang Village
Houhan Village
Houbaojiadian Village
Henghe Village
Dongbaozhang Village
Dishang Village
Damachang Village
Chenzhuang Village
Beilin Village
Baojiachang Village

References

Township-level divisions of Shandong
Zoucheng